The 2019 Dudley Hewitt Cup was the 48th Central Canadian Jr A Ice Hockey Championship for the Canadian Junior Hockey League. The Winner of the 2018 Dudley Hewitt Cup will represent the central region in the 2019 National Junior A Hockey Championship in Brooks, AB.

Teams
Cochrane Crunch (Host)
Regular Season: 31-20-1-4 (5th in NOJHL East Division)
Playoffs: Defeated by Timmins Rock 2-0.

Hearst Lumberjacks (NOJHL Champions)
Regular Season:33-16-6-1 (1st in NOJHL East Division)
Playoffs: Defeated Timmins Rock 4-3, Defeated Powassan Voodoos 4-0, Defeated Soo Thunderbirds 4-3 to win league Championship.

Oakville Blades (OJHL Champions)
Regular Season:44-5-2-4 (1st in OJHL West Division)
Playoffs: Defeated Brampton Admirals 4-1, Defeated Buffalo Jr. Sabres 4-1, Defeated Markham Royals 4-1, Defeated Wellington Dukes 4-0 to win league championship.

Thunder Bay North Stars (SIJHL Champions)
Regular Season:49-5-1-1 (1st in SJIHL)
Playoffs: Defeated Dryden Ice Dogs 4-1, Defeated Red Lake Miners 4-1.

Tournament

Round Robin
x = Clinched championship round berth; y = Clinched first overall

Tie Breaker: Head-to-Head, then 3-way +/-.

Results

Semifinals and final

External links
Dudley Hewitt Cup website 
NOJHL website
OJHL website
SIJHL website
CJHL website

Ice hockey tournaments in Canada
Ontario Provincial Junior A Hockey League
Canadian Junior Hockey League trophies and awards